Vinchiaturo is a comune (municipality) in the Province of Campobasso in the Italian region Molise, located about  southwest of Campobasso.

The name of the town derives from the Latin vincula catenis, meaning "prison with chains".

Vinchiaturo borders the following municipalities: Baranello, Busso, Campobasso, Campochiaro, Colle d'Anchise, Guardiaregia, Mirabello Sannitico, San Giuliano del Sannio.

References

External links
Official website

Cities and towns in Molise